Ifield railway station (pronounced 'Eye-field') serves the neighbourhoods of Ifield and Gossops Green in the West Sussex town of Crawley, England. Train services are provided by Thameslink and Southern.

History
The station was opened on 1 June 1907 as Lyons Crossing Halt, although it became known as Ifield Halt later that year. It was one of a series of unstaffed intermediate halts set up by the London Brighton and South Coast Railway, to be worked by rail motor trains. It became known simply as Ifield station from 1930.

Services 
Thameslink operate all off-peak services at Ifield using  EMUs.

The typical off-peak service in trains per hour is:
 2 tph to  via ,  and 
 2 tph to 

On Sundays, there is an hourly service in each direction although northbound trains run to London Bridge only.

References

External links

Buildings and structures in Crawley
Transport in Crawley
Railway stations in West Sussex
Former London, Brighton and South Coast Railway stations
Railway stations in Great Britain opened in 1907
Railway stations served by Govia Thameslink Railway